Brutil Fridarius Hosé (born 9 October 1979) is a Dutch retired footballer who played as a forward.

Club career
Hosé was born in Willemstad, Curaçao, Netherlands Antilles. Having arrived at AFC Ajax at age 18, he appeared very rarely for the first team of the Eredivisie powerhouse during his five-year spell. His top division debut occurred on 15 November 1998, as he came on as a substitute for Benni McCarthy for the second half of an eventual 2–2 home draw against PSV Eindhoven.

Hosé also represented De Graafschap, HFC Haarlem, Sparta Rotterdam – all loans from the Amsterdam club – FC Dordrecht, Poseidón Néon Póron (Greece), Al-Wakrah Sports Club (Qatar), Sarawak FA (Malaysia Super League) and VV Haaglandia, retiring from professional football in 2009 at the age of only 29.

External links
Stats at Voetbal International 

1979 births
Living people
People from Willemstad
Curaçao footballers
Dutch footballers
Dutch Antillean footballers
Association football forwards
Eredivisie players
Eerste Divisie players
Derde Divisie players
AFC Ajax players
De Graafschap players
HFC Haarlem players
Sparta Rotterdam players
FC Dordrecht players
Haaglandia players
RKSV Leonidas players
Football League (Greece) players
Qatar Stars League players
Al-Wakrah SC players
Sarawak FA players
Netherlands under-21 international footballers
Netherlands Antilles international footballers
Dutch expatriate footballers
Expatriate footballers in Greece
Expatriate footballers in Qatar
Expatriate footballers in Malaysia
CRKSV Jong Colombia players